David Ray may refer to:

 David Ray (poet) (born 1932), American poet
 David Parker Ray (1939–2002), American abductor and possible serial killer
 David Ray (American football) (born 1944), NFL placekicker
 David R. Ray (1945–1969), American navy sailor and Medal of Honor recipient
 David Ray (director) (born 1968), Canadian screenwriter and film director
 David Ray (politician), Republican member of Arkansas House of Representatives

See also
 David Ray Hate Crimes Prevention Act, United States law
 USS David R. Ray (DD-971), US Navy destroyer, sunk 2008

Ray, David